Ramtek Lok Sabha constituency is one of the 48 Lok Sabha (parliamentary) constituencies in the state of Maharashtra in western India. The constituency did not exist during the Indian general elections of 1951-52 for the 1st Lok Sabha. It was created for 1957 Indian general election for the 2nd Lok Sabha, with abolition of the Amravati West constituency in the neighbouring Amravati district.

Assembly segments
Presently, Ramtek Lok Sabha constituency comprises six Vidhan Sabha (legislative assembly) segments. These segments are:

Members of Parliament

^ by-poll

Election results

General elections 2019

General Elections 2014

General Elections 2009

Bye-election 2007

General Elections 2004

See also
 Ramtek
 Nagpur district
 Amravati Lok Sabha constituency (for 1951 elections as Amravati West Lok Sabha constituency )
 List of Constituencies of the Lok Sabha

Notes

External links
Ramtek lok sabha constituency election 2019 results details

Lok Sabha constituencies in Maharashtra
Nagpur district
1957 establishments in Bombay State